Bringing Down the Horse is the second album by American rock band the Wallflowers. It was released worldwide on May 21, 1996. The album was produced by T-Bone Burnett and includes four singles: "6th Avenue Heartache", "One Headlight", "The Difference", and "Three Marlenas".

Bringing Down the Horse reached number four on the Billboard 200 and went quadruple platinum, becoming the Wallflowers' highest-selling album to date. Three songs from the album were nominated for Grammy Awards; in 1997 the Wallflowers received two nominations, both for "6th Avenue Heartache". In 1998 the band received three additional nominations; two for "One Headlight" and one for "The Difference". "One Headlight" won in both categories it was nominated in. The song was the band's most popular single, reaching number one on the Billboard Mainstream Rock, Modern Rock, and Adult top 40 charts. "One Headlight" is also listed at number 58 in Rolling Stones list of the 100 Greatest Pop Songs.

Bringing Down the Horse was issued on vinyl for the first time as a double LP set for the album's 20th anniversary, released by Interscope/Universal Music Group, on May 13, 2016.

Background
The Wallflowers released their debut album in 1992 on Virgin Records and subsequently parted ways with the label shortly after the album's release. The band went back to playing clubs in Los Angeles in hopes of securing another record deal. In the year it took to get another deal, the Wallflowers went through a number of personnel changes; the band's bass player Barrie Maguire and drummer Peter Yanowitz both left the band in 1993. Maguire was quickly replaced by Greg Richling, but the drummer position remained open. Soon after Yanowitz's departure, the Wallflowers were noticed by Jimmy Iovine and Tom Whalley of Interscope Records and the band was signed to the label in 1994.

Recording
After multiple years away from the studio, the Wallflowers were ready to record. However, they encountered some difficulty in finding a producer willing to work with them. The band sent demo tapes to many producers and one ended up in the hands of T-Bone Burnett. Burnett was impressed with what he heard and agreed to produce the band. The Wallflowers entered the studio to begin recording in 1994. Much of the album was recorded in the Los Angeles area. The band's lineup heading into the studio consisted of lead singer-songwriter/rhythm guitarist Jakob Dylan, bassist Greg Richling, keyboard player Rami Jaffee and lead guitarist Tobi Miller. Early in the sessions, however, Miller quit the band for undisclosed reasons, though he remained on good terms with the band. This left the band without a permanent lead guitarist or drummer. Those positions were temporarily filled by drummer Matt Chamberlain and a number of guitarists including Mike Campbell of Tom Petty and the Heartbreakers, Fred Tackett, Jay Joyce and Michael Ward, who would go on to become a permanent member of the group.

Music and lyrics
Bringing Down the Horse further explores roots sounds heard on the band's previous self-titled album but used a more refined approach. This album features an array of instruments normally associated with roots music including banjos, dobros and pedal steel guitars. Dylan commented on the sound of the record:

Upon entering the studio, Dylan, who wrote all the songs for Bringing Down the Horse, had written some songs that were ready to record but needed more to complete the album. Due to the delay between the band's first album and this album, the songwriting process was staggered. Songs for Bringing Down the Horse were written in a span of roughly 5 years. One of the earliest songs, "6th Avenue Heartache", was written before the band's first album; likely around 1990. Several other songs, such as "God Don't Make Lonely Girls", were written when the band was in between labels. During recording sessions, Dylan wrote seven additional songs for the album including "One Headlight", "Bleeders", "Three Marlenas", "The Difference", "Josephine", "Invisible City", and "I Wish I Felt Nothing". On the lyrical content, Dylan stated, "Every song, fortunately or unfortunately is about feeling massively defeated, because that's what I was living." Dylan later said he wrote "I Wish I Felt Nothing" with the band's pedal steel guitarist Leo LeBlanc in mind, who was battling cancer at the time. LeBlanc had been playing with the Wallflowers for several years and was prominently featured on several songs on Bringing Down the Horse, including "Invisible City" and "I Wish I Felt Nothing". He died shortly after completing the album in 1995. Upon the album's release, the Wallflowers dedicated Bringing Down the Horse to LeBlanc.

Track listing

PersonnelThe WallflowersJakob Dylan – lead vocals, rhythm guitar
Rami Jaffee – Hammond B3 organ, backing vocals, keyboards, piano
Greg Richling – bass guitar
Michael Ward – lead guitar, backing vocals
(Mario Calire is credited as drummer but does not perform on this album; he joined the band after recording and prior to release.)Additional musicians'
Tom Lord-Alge – engineering, mixing
T-Bone Burnett – production
Jon Brion – lead guitar on "One Headlight"
Stephen Bruton – background vocals on "I Wish I Felt Nothing"
Mike Campbell – slide guitar on "6th Avenue Heartache"
Matt Chamberlain – drums
Adam Duritz – background vocals on "6th Avenue Heartache"
Don Heffington
Jay Joyce
Leo LeBlanc – pedal steel guitar on "I Wish I Felt Nothing", "God Don't Make Lonely Girls" and "Invisible City"; Dobro on "One Headlight"
Gary Louris – background vocals on "One Headlight" and "The Difference"
Tobi Miller
Michael Penn – background vocals on "Angel on my Bike"
Sam Phillips – background vocals on "One Headlight" and "Laughing Out Loud"
David Rawlings
Fred Tackett
Patrick Warren

Charts

Weekly charts

Year-end charts

Decade-end charts

Certifications

Release history

†This version contains bonus tracks

References

1996 albums
Albums produced by T Bone Burnett
Country rock albums by American artists
Folk rock albums by American artists
Interscope Records albums
The Wallflowers albums